Billy Keikeya is a fictional character in the miniseries and television remake of Battlestar Galactica. He is portrayed by Paul Campbell. Billy appeared until late in the second season, at which point he was killed by terrorists. Paul Campbell has said that his character was killed because he had been unwilling to commit to a five-year contract.

In the miniseries, Keikeya was assigned to Secretary of Education Laura Roslin as an aide during the decommissioning of the Battlestar Galactica. As he and Roslin were en route back to Caprica, the Cylon attack occurred, forcing Roslin to assume the presidency. Keikeya lost most of his family on Picon during the attack. After the Galactica and the remnants of society fled the Cylon attack, Keikeya continued to work with the President, rarely leaving her side.

Billy was among the first to deduce that Roslin was dying of cancer. Both he and Roslin developed a strong loyalty to each other; Roslin once commented that Billy was like a son to her, and the closest thing to family she had. According to Commander Adama, Roslin said she saw similarities between Keikeya and the late President Richard Adar and believed that Keikeya would be President one day. Billy used to be in a debate team back on Caprica.

During the military coup that put Roslin in prison, Keikeya worked with several of Galactica's crewmembers to break her out. However, Keikeya refused to escape with Roslin after the breakout, fearing her break with the military could cause serious fractures within the fleet. Keikeya later traveled with Adama to locate Roslin on the surface of Kobol and reunite the fleet. Keikeya was also one of the few people to enter the Tomb of Athena and see the map to Earth (Home, Part II).

During much of his time after the Cylon attack, Keikeya was in a romantic relationship with Petty Officer Anastasia "Dee" Dualla. He eventually proposed to her; however, she said that she could never marry him. Keikeya later discovered Dualla and Lee Adama in a romantic setting on Cloud Nine. The establishment was seized by terrorists. During the incident, Keikeya tried to convince one of the terrorists, Vinson, that what he was doing was wrong.  When Vinson revealed he was doing it because he lost his brother in a Cylon attack, Billy related that he'd lost his own family in the destruction of the Colonies.  Throughout the incident, Billy eyed a terrorist's gun, but Dee told him not to try as he wasn't military.  When the ruse Admiral Adama used to try to defuse the situation is discovered, the terrorist leader orders Dee's death.  Billy grabs a gun from a terrorist and shoots Dee's would-be killer, Vinson, but Billy is shot and killed in return.  Roslin later cries over his body in the morgue (having earlier told Adama that Billy was the only family she had left) and is seen to keep a picture of him on her desk.  He was soon replaced by Tory Foster as Roslin's aide.

References

External links 
 Billy Keikeya at Battlestar Wiki

Battlestar Galactica (2004 TV series) characters
Fictional advisors
Fictional civil servants
Television characters introduced in 2003
Atheism in television